The Women's artistic individual all-around competition at the 2022 Mediterranean Games was held on 28 June 2022 at the Olympic Complex Sports Hall.

Qualification

Final

References

Women's artistic individual all-around
2022
2022 in women's gymnastics